Chrozophora tinctoria (commonly known as dyer's croton, giradol, turnsole or dyer's litmus plant) is a plant species native to the Mediterranean, the Middle East, India, Pakistan, and Central Asia. It is also present as a weed in North America and Australia.

Description
It is an annual, typically found in nutrient-poor ground.  It develops a large taproot. The plant is erect and covered with wool-like hairs. The ash-green leaves are alternate. The tiny monecious flowers are grouped in a raceme. The lower, female flowers lack petals and the upper male flowers have five small yellow petals. Pollination is by ants. The fruits are conspicuous and consist of three dark green conjoined spheres. Their surface is decorated with white scales and warty structures. Each sphere contains three seeds, which are propelled away from the plant by the mechanical force of the mature fruit twisting as it opens.

Use for dye
Chrozophora  tinctoria produced the blue-purple colorant "turnsole" (also known as katasol or folium ) used in medieval illuminated manuscripts and as a food colorant in Dutch cheese and certain liquors. Its use was mostly as substitute of the more expensive Tyrian purple, the famous dye obtained from Murex molluscs. The color comes from the plant's fruit, specifically its dry outer coat. The colorant is also obtained from the translucent sap contained in the plant cells when the leaves of the plant are broken off and exposed to the air. Different shades of blue and purple may also be obtained when the juice extracts are exposed to the vapors emitted from ammonia (NH3), and which in France, during the late 19th century, was produced by applying fresh horse manure and urine to the fabric that was soaked with the plant extract. The plant has historically been used throughout the Levant to dye clothing.  of the plant produces  of sap, and with this quantity one is able to dye  of fabric rolls.

In 2020, an interdisciplinary team of researchers from FCT NOVA, University of Porto and University of Aveiro, identified the complex chemical structure of the medieval purple-blue dye extracted from the fruits of Chrozophora tinctoria. The chemical structure of the medieval dye was a mystery until now. The extracts obtained showed a novel blue chemical, chrozophoridine as the main chromophore.

References

Chrozophoreae
Plants described in 1753
Taxa named by Carl Linnaeus
Taxa named by Adrien-Henri de Jussieu
Flora of Asia
Plant dyes
Flora of Malta